The men's triple jump at the 2022 European Athletics Championships took place at the Olympiastadion on 15 and 16 August.

Records

Schedule

Results

Qualification

Qualification: 16.95 m (Q) or best 12 performers (q)

Final

References

Triple jump
Triple jump at the European Athletics Championships